The men's team sabre event at the 2020 Summer Olympics took place on 28 July 2021 at the Makuhari Messe, with 27 fencers (9 teams of 3) from 9 nations competing.

Background
Officially the 25th appearance of the event, it has been held at every Summer Olympics since 1908 except 2016 (during the time when team events were rotated off the schedule, with only two of the three weapons for each of the men's and women's categories).

The reigning (2012) Olympic champion is South Korea (Gu Bon-gil, Won Woo-young, Kim Jung-hwan, and Oh Eun-seok). South Korea has also won the last three World Championships in the event, with the 2019 (reigning) team consisting of Gu, Kim Jun-ho, Oh Sang-uk and Ha Han-sol. A preview from Olympics.com identified Hungary as a historically strong nation in the event looking to continue its success, led by 2012 and 2016 individual gold medalist  Áron Szilágyi. Szilágyi in the meanwhile also won the 2020 gold medal in individual sabre competition.

Qualification

A National Olympic Committee (NOC) could enter a team of 3 fencers in the men's team sabre. These fencers also automatically qualified for the individual event.

There are 8 dedicated quota spots for men's team sabre. They are allocated as through the world team ranking list of 5 April 2021. The top 4 spots, regardless of geographic zone, qualify (South Korea, Hungary, Italy, and Germany). The next four spots are allocated to separate geographic zones, as long as an NOC from that zone is in the top 16. These places went to Iran (Asia/Oceania), the United States (Americas), Egypt (Africa), and ROC (Europe).

Additionally, there are 8 host/invitational spots that can be spread throughout the various fencing events. Japan qualified one men's sabre fencer through normal individual qualification and used two host quota places to complete a men's sabre team.

The COVID-19 pandemic delayed many of the events for qualifying for fencing, moving the close of the rankings period back to April 5, 2021 rather than the original April 4, 2020.

Competition format
The 2020 tournament is a single-elimination tournament, with classification matches for all places. Each match features the three fencers on each team competing in a round-robin, with 9 three-minute bouts to 5 points; the winning team is the one that reaches 45 total points first or is leading after the end of the nine bouts. Standard sabre rules regarding target area, striking, and priority are used.

Schedule
The competition is held over a single day, Wednesday, 28 July. The first session runs from 10 a.m. to approximately 3:20 p.m. (when all matches except the bronze and gold medal finals are expected to conclude), after which there is a break until 6:30 p.m. before the medal bouts are held.

All times are Japan Standard Time (UTC+9)

Results

5–8th place classification

Final classification

References

External links
Draw 

Men's team sabre
Men's events at the 2020 Summer Olympics